Rick Moody (born May 26, 1954) is a former women's basketball assistant coach at Syracuse University, arriving in 2007. He previously served as the head coach for Alabama Crimson Tide women's basketball from 1990 to 2005. He is Alabama's all-time leader in games won among basketball coaches at Alabama in terms of wins and winning percentage. His 310 total wins are more than all other Crimson Tide women's basketball coaches combined.

Coach Moody led his Alabama squads to 11 post-season tournaments including eight trips to the NCAA Tournament.  In the NCAA Tournaments involving Alabama while coached by Moody, Alabama advanced to five straight Sweet Sixteen appearances, as well as its only Final Four appearance in 1994.  Alabama women's basketball enjoyed eight seasons of winning 20 or more games while Moody was the head coach.

He also led the Tide to a record 26 wins in the 1993–94 season. Under his direction, Alabama reached a final top-25 ranking eight times. In addition, they recorded 44 wins over nationally ranked opponents including nine versus top-10 squads. His coaching career is also highlighted by outstanding numbers, including 19 regular-season tournament titles, 145 home victories, 97 regular-season SEC wins and 13 SEC Tournament victories.

Head coaching record

References

1954 births
Living people
Alabama Crimson Tide women's basketball coaches
Syracuse Orange women's basketball coaches
American women's basketball coaches